The Cincinnati City Council is the lawmaking body of Cincinnati, Ohio. The nine-member city council is elected at-large in a single election in which each voter chooses nine candidates from the field. The nine top vote-getters win seats on the council for a four-year term.

Until the charter of 1925, the council comprised 32 members—six elected at-large and 26 elected from single-member wards. The 1925 charter instituted the present nine-member council elected in a single non-partisan, at-large election.  From 1925 to 1955, elections were under the single transferable vote form of proportional representation. The mayor was chosen by the council from among its members.  In the 1970s, the system was changed so that the top vote-getter in the council election automatically became mayor. Since 2001, the mayor is chosen in a separate election.

Although the election officially is non-partisan, the local Charterite party and three of the major political parties (Democratic, Republican, and Green Party) all endorse candidates in the race. Party designations, however, can be fluid. After the 1997 election, for example, Democrats Minette Cooper and Dwight Tillery formed a majority coalition on the council with Republicans Charlie Winburn, Phil Heimlich, and Jeanette Cissell.

Prior to 2013, council members were elected for two-year terms. In 2013, a referendum was passed changing City Council to four-year terms. In 2018, two competing proposals were placed on the ballot to modify the structure of City Council yet again. Issue 10 would bring back two-year terms; Issue 11 would keep four-year terms but stagger them, such that five council members would be elected in a mayoral election year, and four council members would be elected two years later. Issue 10 passed with a larger margin of victory, meaning that City Council will return to two-year terms beginning with the 2021 election.

The next city council election is scheduled for November 7, 2023.

Cincinnati City Council Members

Election results 
Italic type indicates incumbent.

Notes

External links 
 Cincinnati City Council
 SmartVoter.org – Current & historical election information to 1998 for Hamilton County, OH presented by the League of Women Voters
 Hamilton County, OH Board of Elections Current & historical election information
 City of Cincinnati – Elections Commission Political Contribution Data
 Cincinnati Municipal Code

City Council, Election Results

Ohio city councils